Stanley Charles Ridges (17 July 1890 – 22 April 1951) was an English-born, American actor who made more than 100 appearances in theatre and movies from 1917 to 1951.

After his American film debut in Success (1923), he appeared in films such as Crime Without Passion (1934), The Scoundrel (1935), If I Were King and The Mad Miss Manton (both 1938), Black Friday (1940), Sergeant York (1941), Wilson (1944) and No Way Out (1950). He also had the starring role in the B-picture False Faces (1943).

Early life 
Stanley Charles Ridges was born 17 July 1890 in Southampton, Hampshire. He later became a protégé of Beatrice Lillie, a star of musical stage comedies, and spent many years learning and honing his craft on the stage.

Career 
Eventually making his way to America, Ridges began as a song-and-dance man on Broadway, but later turned to dramatic roles onstage, appearing in such plays as Maxwell Anderson's Mary of Scotland (as Lord Morton) and Valley Forge (as Lieutenant Colonel Lucifer Tench), becoming a romantic leading man.

Ridges' silent film debut was in Success (1923). With his excellent diction and rich voice, he easily made the transition into sound films, with his career taking off at age 43, in Crime Without Passion (1934), with Claude Rains. Ridges found himself cast in character roles, as his greying hair put his romantic leading man days at an end.

His better known roles were probably two different characters in one film, one of them the kindly Professor Kingsley and the other the murderous Red Cannon in the thriller Black Friday (1940). The Jekyll and Hyde transformations gave Ridges a chance to display his acting ability.

Ridges often was cast in supporting roles in many classic films, and played the lead only once, in the B-picture False Faces (1943).

Among Ridges's other film roles were as the Scotland Yard inspector who is shadowing Charles Laughton in the film The Suspect (1944), as Major Buxton (Gary Cooper's commanding officer) in Sergeant York (1942), as Professor Siletsky in To Be or Not to Be (also 1942), and as Cary Travers Grayson, the official physician for the president in Wilson (1944).

By 1950, he had just begun an appearing in television anthologies such as Studio One and Philco Television Playhouse. His last feature film, the Ginger Rogers comedy The Groom Wore Spurs, in which he played a mobster, was released a month before he died.

Death 
Ridges died 22 April 1951 in Westbrook, Connecticut, aged 60.

Filmography

Broadway roles

Film

References

External links 

 
 
 Stanley Ridges at Turner Classic Movies 
 
 

1890 births
1951 deaths
20th-century American male actors
British emigrants to the United States
Male Western (genre) film actors
Male actors from Southampton